Circus of Sound is the third studio album by the band OHM, released on August 26, 2008 through Tone Center Records.

Track listing

Personnel
Chris Poland – guitar, engineering, production
Joel Taylor – drums (tracks 1–3)
Frank Briggs – drums (tracks 4–7)
Kofi Baker – drums (tracks 8–14)
Robertino Pagliari – bass
Petar Sardelich – engineering
Ralph Patlan – mixing
Steve Hall – mastering

References

2008 albums
Tone Center Records albums